Gray Stenborg  (13 October 1921 – 24 September 1943) was a New Zealand flying ace of the Royal New Zealand Air Force (RNZAF) during the Second World War. He was credited with 14 confirmed victories, one shared destroyed, and three damaged.

Born in Auckland, Stenborg joined the RNZAF in July 1940. After receiving flight training in New Zealand and Canada, he was sent to England to serve with the Royal Air Force. His first operational posting was to No. 485 Squadron and he later flew with No. 111 Squadron, and during his time there shot down four enemy aircraft. In June 1942, he was sent to Malta as a reinforcement pilot, flying a Supermarine Spitfire off the flight deck of HMS Eagle to the island where he joined No. 185 Squadron. He destroyed several aircraft during his time on Malta, returning to Europe in late August 1942. After a period of time as an instructor, he was posted to No. 91 Squadron. He was killed on 24 September 1943 during a mission escorting bombers to France.

Early life
Gray Stenborg was born in Auckland on 13 October 1921, the only son of Gunnar Stenborg, a Swedish emigrant to New Zealand, and his wife Ruby. The family lived in the Auckland suburb of Parnell and Stenborg was educated at King's College, where he played in the school's first XI. He was also active in rowing and yachting.

Second World War
In July 1940, Stenborg joined the Royal New Zealand Air Force and trained at Whenuapai on Blackburn Baffin and Vickers Vildebeest aircraft. By the end of the year he had been selected for pilot training and went on to No. 4 Elementary Training School in February 1941 before proceeding to Canada two months later for further flight training. He gained his wings and was promoted to sergeant in August and shortly afterwards was dispatched to England to serve with the Royal Air Force.

United Kingdom

On arrival in the United Kingdom Stenborg went to No. 58 Operational Training Unit (OTU) at Grangemouth, flying Supermarine Spitfire fighter aircraft, and in December 1941 was posted to No. 485 Squadron. He flew on three operations before being transferred to No. 111 Squadron in January 1942. He shot down a Focke Wulf 190 fighter near St. Omer on 26 April, commencing a run where he shot down four aircraft in five days. He destroyed another Fw 190 the next day and on 30 April he shot down two more.

Malta
In early June 1942, Stenborg, now a pilot officer, was sent to Malta, sailing aboard the aircraft carrier HMS Eagle as a reinforcement for the squadrons operating from the island. He flew a Spitfire off the flight deck of Eagle early in the morning of 9 June and on arrival at Malta was assigned to No. 185 Squadron. One of four pilots from the squadron scrambled in the evening of 15 June to deal with a bombing raid on a convoy off Malta, he damaged two Junkers Ju 88 medium bombers and destroyed an escorting Messerschmitt Bf 109 fighter. He claimed two Bf 109s on 5 July; they were part of a group of between 15 and 20 fighters escorting Ju 88s making a bombing raid on Malta. Another two Bf 109s were claimed as destroyed on 9 July, when Stenborg was part of a group of 30 Spitfires that intercepted six Ju 88s and escorting fighters raiding Takali. For his exploits during the early part of the month, he was awarded the Distinguished Flying Cross (DFC). The citation, published on 28 July in the London Gazette, read:

At the end of July, while carrying out an air test on a Spitfire, Stenborg encountered three Bf 109s. Having the benefit of height he surprised the trio, destroying one of them. On 17 August, while leading a flight of four Spitfires, he came across several Bf 109s. One of the pilots in his flight destroyed two Bf 109s while Stenborg shot down another. However, in turn he had his aircraft badly damaged. He was eventually able to bale out, landing in the sea  from Malta and taking to his inflatable dinghy before being rescued. Stenborg was soon joined at No. 185 Squadron by fellow New Zealander John Houlton, who later described him as "an amusing, volatile type". At the time of Houlton's arrival, Stenborg had just been grounded for performing low-level acrobatics over the squadron's airfield.

Channel Front  
Having flown 34 operational flights for No. 185 Squadron, Stenborg returned to England in late August and spent a period of time on instructing duties at No. 58 OTU, and then went on to Flight Leaders School before being posted in May 1943 to No. 91 Squadron, which operated Mk XII Spitfires. Now a flight lieutenant, on 24 August, he shared in the destruction of a Fw 190 and on 4 September claimed sole credit for destroying another Fw 190. He damaged a further Fw 190 the same day. A Fw 190 was shot down on 16 September followed by a Bf 109 a week later. 

While flying a Ramrod mission escorting bombers to Beauvais in France on 24 September 1943, No. 91 Squadron encountered a large group of enemy fighters. During the resulting dogfight, Stenborg was shot down and killed. His aircraft crashed  from Beauvais. Buried at the Marissel French National Cemetery at Oise, he had flown 120 operational flights for No. 91 Squadron and 188 altogether by the time of his death. He was credited with 14 enemy aircraft destroyed, one shared destroyed, and three damaged.

Legacy
He is one of the 191 New Zealanders killed in the Second World War who are listed on the Takapuna War Memorial. He is also listed on the Howick and Pakuranga First World War Memorial, in a section for those killed in the Second World War.

Notes

References

1921 births
1943 deaths
Military personnel from Auckland
New Zealand military personnel killed in World War II
New Zealand World War II flying aces
New Zealand World War II pilots
People educated at King's College, Auckland
People from Auckland
Recipients of the Distinguished Flying Cross (United Kingdom)
Royal New Zealand Air Force personnel
Aviators killed by being shot down